Joseph Thompson is a British theatre, screen and voice actor best known for playing Dr. Paul Browning in the British Channel 4 soap opera Hollyoaks. He studied at the University of Bristol and trained as an actor at the Webber Douglas Academy of Dramatic Art.

Career 
He made his 2005 theatre debut in Romeo and Juliet at the Royal Exchange, Manchester alongside Andrew Garfield and Gugu Mbatha-Raw and has worked extensively on stage. Notable productions include  The Voysey Inheritance Fram and The Cherry Orchard at the National Theatre, Petrol Jesus Nightmare #5 at The Traverse Theatre and Earthquakes in London for Headlong. Other television work includes playing Eddie in Falling Water, Preston in Time After Time, George Hastings in the Sky Television adaptation of She Stoops To Conquer and roles in Elementary, Casualty, and EastEnders.

Awards 
He won the British Soap Award for Best Newcomer at The British Soap Awards and was nominated in the same category at the National Television Awards in 2013 for his portrayal of Dr. Browning. He was also nominated for Best On-Screen Partnership with Jennifer Metcalfe at the 2014 British Soap Awards.

Personal life 
Following his departure from Hollyoaks he moved to New York.

References

External links
 

Year of birth missing (living people)
Living people
20th-century English male actors
English male soap opera actors
Place of birth missing (living people)